The 46th Tactical Missile Squadron is an inactive United States Air Force unit, formed by the consolidation of two inactive units in September 1985.

The squadron's first predecessor was organized in May 1942 as the 46th Troop Carrier Squadron.  After training in the United States, it deployed to the Southwest Pacific Theater, where it engaged in combat, earning two Distinguished Unit Citations and a Philippine Presidential Unit Citation for its actions.  Following V-J Day, it deployed to Japan, serving as part of the occupation forces until inactivating in 1949.

The second predecessor unit was activated in January 1959 as the 46th Air Defense Missile Squadron.  It served at McGuire Air Force Base, New Jersey as part of the air defenses of the northeastern United States with BOMARC missiles until inactivating in October 1972.

History

Airlift Operations

The squadron was first activated under the 317th Transport Group (later 317th Troop Carrier Group), an element of Air Transport Command (later I Troop Carrier Command) in May 1942 as the group expanded from three to four squadrons.  The group and squadron equipped with Douglas C-47 Skytrains and trained at several airfields in Texas, the midwest and the southeast.   It also performed various airlift missions as part of its training.    The squadron deployed to Australia, arriving in January 1943 as an element of Fifth Air Force.  It made numerous flights in unarmed planes over the Owen Stanley Range transporting reinforcement and supplies to Wau, Papua New Guinea, where enemy forces were threatening a valuable Allied airdrome, for which it was awarded a Distinguished Unit Citation.   It performed paratroop drops at Nadzab (the first airborne operation in the Southwest Pacific) and Noemfoor in New Guinea; Tagaytay, Luzon, and Corregidor and Aparri in the Philippines.   Also performed cargo airlift, supply and evacuation, and other assigned missions along the northern coast of New Guinea; the Dutch East Indies and in the Philippines as part of MacArthur's island hopping offensive against the Japanese in the Southwest Pacific.  This included supplying guerillas in Mindanao, Cebu, and Panay.  In April 1945, it bombed Carabao Island with drums of napalm.

The squadron deployed to Okinawa in August 1945 after the Japanese capitulation and became part of the American occupation forces.  It replaced its C-47s with longer range Curtiss C-46 Commando aircraft and moved to Japan and the Korean peninsula during late 1945.   Its initial post-war missions included the evacuation of former Allied prisoners of war; later primarily cargo transport missions in the occupied areas of Japan and Korea during the postwar era.    The squadron inactivated in 1949 in Japan due to budget constraints; its aircraft being assigned to other units as part of the consolidation.

Cold War Air Defense
The squadron was activated as the 46th Air Defense Missile Squadron (BOMARC) in 1959 at McGuire Air Force Base, New Jersey, and stood alert during the Cold War, with IM-99A (later CIM-10) BOMARC surface to air antiaircraft missiles.   The squadron was tied into a Semi-Automatic Ground Environment (SAGE) direction center which could use analog computers to process information from ground radars, picket ships and airborne aircraft to accelerate the display of tracking data at the direction center to quickly direct the missile site to engage hostile aircraft.  It trained personnel and prepared for operation of the BOMARC surface-to-air missiles; operated and maintained BOMARC missiles and associated equipment, trained personnel, and maintained a capability to intercept and destroy hostile aircraft until inactivation. The squadron was inactivated on 31 October 1972, one of the last two BOMARC missile squadrons inactivated.

Although geographically separated from the base, it was an off base facility of McGuire and the squadron received administrative and logistical support from McGuire.

Consolidation
The 46th Troop Carrier Squadron and the 46th Air Defense Missile Squadron were consolidated on 19 September 1985 as the 46th Tactical Missile Squadron while remaining inactive.

Lineage
46th Troop Carrier Squadron
 Constituted as the 46th Transport Squadron on 30 May 1942
 Activated on 15 June 1942
 Redesignated as the  46th Troop Carrier Squadron on 4 July 1942
 Redesignated as the  46th Troop Carrier Squadron, Medium on 10 August 1948
 Inactivated on 1 April 1949
 Consolidated with the 46 Air Defense Missile Squadron on 19 September 1985

46th Air Defense Missile Squadron
 Constituted as the 46th Air Defense Missile Squadron (BOMARC) on 10 December 1958
 Activated on 1 January 1959
 Inactivated on 31 October 1972
 Consolidated with the 46 Troop Carrier Squadron on 19 September 1985

Assignments
 317th Transport Group (later 317th Troop Carrier Group), 15 June 1942
 Fifth Air Force, 18 August 1948 - 1 April 1949 (attached to 317th Troop Carrier Wing), 18 August 1948, 6146th Station Group, 1 October 1948, 374th Troop Carrier Group, 5 March 1949 - 1 April 1949
 New York Air Defense Sector, 1 January 1959
 21st Air Division, 1 April 1966
 35th Air Division, 1 December 1967 – 1 October 1972

Stations

 Duncan Field, Texas, 15 June 1942
 Bowman Field, Kentucky, 19 June 1942;
 Lawson Field, Georgia, 10 October 1942
 Laurinburg-Maxton Airport, North Carolina, 3–12 December 1942
 Garbutt Field, Australia, 23 January 1943
 Port Moresby Airfield Complex, Papua New Guinea, 1 October 1943
 Finschhafen Airfield, Papua New Guinea, 19 April 1944
 Hollandia Airfield Complex, New Guinea, 5 July 1944

 Tanauan Airfield, Leyte, Philippines, 19 November 1944
 Clark Field, Luzon, Philippines, March 1945
 Kadena Airfield, Okinawa, 19 August 1945
 Seoul Airport, Korea, 19 October 1945
 Tachikawa Airfield, Japan, 19 January 1946
 Kimpo Airfield, Korea, 10 July 1946
 Matsushima Air Field, Japan, 1 August 1948
 Tachikawa Air Base, Japan, 1 October 1948 – 1 April 1949
 McGuire Air Force Base, New Jersey, 1 January 1959 – 1 October 1972

Awards and campaigns

Aircraft and missiles
 Douglas C-47 Skytrain, 1942–1945
 Curtiss C-46 Commando, 1945–1949
 Boeing IM-99 (later CIM-10) BOMARC, 1959-1972

See also

 List of United States Air Force missile squadrons
 List of Douglas C-47 Skytrain operators
 BOMARC missile accident site

References

Notes

Bibliography

 
 
 
 
 

046
1942 establishments in the United States